Pesaro railway station serves the city and comune of Pesaro, in the region of Marche, central Italy.  Opened in 1861, it forms part of the Bologna–Ancona railway.

The station is currently managed by Rete Ferroviaria Italiana (RFI).  However, the commercial area of the passenger building is managed by Centostazioni.  Train services are operated by Trenitalia.  Each of these companies is a subsidiary of Ferrovie dello Stato (FS), Italy's state-owned rail company.

Location
Pesaro railway station is situated at Piazzale Giovanni Falcone e Paolo Borsellino, southwest of the city centre.

History
The station was opened on 17 November 1861, upon the inauguration of the final section of the Bologna–Ancona railway, between Rimini and Ancona.

The original operator of the station was the Società Generale delle Strade Ferrate Romane.  In the reorganization of the Italian railways in 1865, the Kingdom of Italy entrusted its operation to the Società per le Strade Ferrate Meridionali (SFM).  The latter company retained that function until the nationalization of the Italian railways in 1905.

During its history, the station has suffered severe setbacks, although the city has been constantly developing.

In 1935, the original passenger building was replaced by the present structure, designed by the architect Roberto Narducci.

Features
The station yard has thirteen tracks, of which five are dedicated to passenger traffic.

The passenger tracks are served by three platforms accessible to users through a pedestrian underpass - lifts are available. The busiest passenger tracks are track 2, used by southbound trains, and track 3, which serves northbound trains. Tracks 1, 4 and 5 are used infrequently, generally for trains either originating or terminating in Pesaro.

Gallery

Train services

The station is served by regional, InterCity and High speed trains.

The main origins and destinations of the regional trains are Bologna, Rimini, Milan and Ancona.

During the summer, the station serves as a terminus for treni del mare: interregional trains organized by Ferrovie Emilia Romagna, and originating in Bergamo, Brescia, Cremona and Mantua.

The Intercity and High speed trains mostly link Pesaro with Roma Termini, Lecce, Ancona and Milan Central.

The station is served by the following services (incomplete):

High speed services (FrecciaRossa) Turin - Milan - Bologna - Ancona - Pescara
High speed services (FrecciArgento) Milan - Bologna - Ancona - Pescara -  Bari
Medium speed services (Frecciabianca) Milan - Parma - Bologna - Ancona - Pescara - Foggia - Bari - Brindisi - Lecce
Medium speed services (Frecciabianca) Milan - Parma - Bologna - Ancona - Pescara - Foggia - Bari - Taranto
Medium speed services (Frecciabianca) Turin - Parma - Bologna - Ancona - Pescara - Foggia - Bari - Brindisi - Lecce
Medium speed services (Frecciabianca) Venice - Padua - Bologna - Ancona - Pescara - Foggia - Bari - Brindisi - Lecce
Medium speed services (Frecciabianca) Ravenna - Rimini - Foligno - Terni - Rome
Intercity services Bologna - Rimini - Ancona - Pescara - Foggia - Bari - Brindisi - Lecce
Intercity services Bologna - Rimini - Ancona - Pescara - Foggia - Bari - Taranto
Slow speed local services (Regionale) to other big and small cities in Marche and Emilia-Romagna (Fano, Rimini, Bologna, Piacenza, Ravenna, Ancona ecc...)

Interchange
The station has a bus terminal for urban and suburban buses, with direct links to the city of Urbino.

See also

History of rail transport in Italy
List of railway stations in the Marche
Rail transport in Italy
Railway stations in Italy

References

External links

This article is based upon a translation of the Italian language version as at January 2011.

Railway Station
Railway stations in the Marche
Railway stations opened in 1861
1861 establishments in Italy
Railway stations in Italy opened in the 19th century